Breutelia grandis is a species of moss in the family Bartramiaceae. It is found in Brazil.

References

External links 

 Breutelia grandis at The Plant List
 Breutelia grandis at Tropicos

Plants described in 1894
Bartramiales
Flora of Brazil